Osella is an Italian racing car manufacturer and former Formula One team. They participated in 132 Grands Prix between 1980 and 1990. They achieved two points finishes and scored five championship points.

Early days

Named after its founder Vincenzo "Enzo" Osella, the team began life by racing Abarth sports cars among local and national races in Italy since 1965. Though relatively successful (Osella eventually took over the factory Abarth sports car program), Osella expanded into single-seater racing in 1974 to further develop his business. In 1975, the team entered the European Formula Two Championship for the first time, achieving some success with its own car, the BMW-powered Osella FA2.

Osella continued in Formula Two in 1976, but financial problems meant that the team was not competitive and withdrew from the championship before the end of the season. In the following years, the FA2s were occasionally entered by privateers, one of them being the Swiss Charly Kiser.

Late 1970s
Enzo Osella tried to make some money by selling a self-penned Formula Three car, the Osella FA3, with little success. Only a few privateers were optimistic enough to buy the simple, untested machine, which with Toyota or Lancia engines competed in the 1976 German and Italian F3 championships without making any great impression. After this, the team concentrated on running in local sports car events during 1977 and 1978.

Osella returned to the European Formula Two Championship in 1979, with American driver Eddie Cheever racing the well-used FA2, again powered by a BMW engine. The car was good enough to win three races and take Cheever to fourth in the championship. This was enough for Enzo Osella to take the plunge into the cut-and-thrust world of Formula One.

Formula One

Early years
Osella Squadra Corse appeared in the world of Grand Prix racing with its first Formula One machine, the FA1. The car was designed by Giorgio Stirano. Powered by Ford Cosworth DFV, it was overweight and aerodynamically inefficient. The car was presented in a blue and white livery with large Denim branding on the sidepods. Many components were manufactured in-house which meant that they were cheap to produce but not always state-of-the-art. The driver was again Eddie Cheever who was able to finish just one race in the whole season. Frequently he had to suffer from the massive unreliability of his car. In the following seasons, the basic design was changed several times.

In the early years, most of the work was done by interim designers like Giorgio Valentini or Tony Southgate, but frequently Enzo Osella himself also worked on the cars. Most of these attempts brought no improvement as high-tech solutions could not be financed. Jean-Pierre Jarier finished fourth at Imola in 1982 (where only 14 cars started) and scored the first Championship points for the young team in a car that was by now dubbed Osella FA1C.

Despite this result, neither the financial nor the technical situation improved. Few sponsors were attracted by the tiny Italian team. Denim only stayed for the first two seasons, Kelemata was no more reliable, and others like Landis & Gyr vanished as quickly as they had come. Most of the other sponsors were small or mid-size companies from Turin or the region of Piedmont.

Driver changes

The lack of funding led to frequent driver changes as the team demanded that their drivers bring significant sponsorship to keep the team afloat. Some drivers started their F1 careers at Osella, such as Alex Caffi and Gabriele Tarquini, while Piercarlo Ghinzani had four stints with the team. Others disappeared as quickly as they had come, such as Allen Berg and Franco Forini. Enzo Osella gave the young Austrian Jo Gartner his one and only chance to drive a Formula One car in 1984. Riccardo Paletti also had high hopes, but was killed in a start-line accident at the 1982 Canadian Grand Prix.

None of these drivers were able to push the team forward. Finally, Osella continued to live hand-to-mouth each year, with little or no improvement in competitiveness.

Alfa Romeo

In the mid-1980s, Osella was the beneficiary of factory Alfa Romeo engines, both in naturally-aspirated (1983–84) and turbo (1984–88) forms. On one hand, the Alfa engine program helped the team to survive the increasingly professional turbo era; on the other hand, the heavy, unreliable and thirsty machines contributed to the team's lack of competitiveness. At least at first, Alfa offered some technical input to the team; the 1984 Osella FA1F was based on the 1983 works Alfa Romeo 183T, which had been loaned to the team for "design assistance" purposes. All the following Osella models up to the FA1L in  had their origins in the initial Alfa design.

The Alfa turbo engine, the 890T, was not reliable. Turbos blew up regularly and power output had to be reduced down to the level of the non-turbo cars just to achieve the necessary reliability. On more than one occasion, Osella tried to replace the 890T with more up-to-date Motori Moderni turbos (which Minardi did not support) or with Cosworth engines. In the end, both were too expensive, so Osella had to stick with the increasingly outdated but cheap 890T.

For 1988 – the last year before turbos were banned – the team re-branded the 890T as the "Osella V8". This came about after Alfa's parent company, Fiat, grew tired of the negative publicity the team had given the 890T and, while allowing them to continue using the engine, refused to allow the Alfa Romeo name to be used.

After driver Nicola Larini managed some impressive times in pre-season testing at Monza, the team were quietly confident of a decent showing through 1988, as many teams had switched to naturally-aspirated engines in preparation for 1989. However, the reality was that the FA1L, with its outdated turbo, was not up to the challenge: Larini often failed to qualify or even pre-qualify, and was also excluded from the San Marino Grand Prix before practice after failing to get through scrutineering due to illegal changes made to the chassis. At the end of the season, Enzo Osella was more than happy to be finally rid of the old Alfa engine.

Cosworth power and Fondmetal
The 1989 season saw much improvement. The all-new, Cosworth DFR-powered Osella FA1M was a big step ahead, and ultra-sticky qualifying tyres from Pirelli brought some success, at least in the qualifying sessions (most notably in the Japanese Grand Prix, where Larini qualified 10th). The fine qualifying performance brought no results in the races; the Osella cars almost never saw the finish line due to several technical failures. The most tragic race was the Canadian Grand Prix in which Larini was third before the FA1M's electrics failed due to water ingress. Piercarlo Ghinzani re-joined the team for 1989 with limited success, often failing to qualify. He announced his retirement at the season ending Australian Grand Prix. While Larini failed to start the very wet race when his electrics were water-logged on the grid, Ghinzani's race and career came to a violent end when a high-speed collision with the Lotus of Nelson Piquet left Ghinzani with an injured ankle.

In 1990, after ten years in Formula One and still without any meaningful sponsorship, Enzo Osella sold shares in his team to metalwork magnate Gabriele Rumi, as part of a sponsorship deal with Rumi's Fondmetal company. During , the team entered a single car for French driver Olivier Grouillard, who gained a reputation in F1 for being a "blocker", holding up faster cars and ignoring his mirrors. At the end of 1990, Rumi took over the remainder of the team and renamed it Fondmetal.

Sportscars
The involvement of Gabriele Rumi meant the end of Enzo Osella's activities in Formula One. Instead he concentrated on the thing he knew best: sports car racing. During his Formula One years, he never gave up building sports cars; in fact this was one of the few projects that regularly brought work and money to Volpiano, especially in hillclimb races, with Mauro Nesti many times winner of European and Italian Championship, and many other drivers, with PA9 and PA9/90 models.

A few of those sports cars even found their way to the Can Am series, although without much success. The most prestigious result was during the 1984 Can Am season with a third place in the championship for the 2-litre class; the car was the Osella PA10 driven by Armando Trentini, and was the only two-seater in the championship; the rest of the 2-litre class field comprised single-seater F2 cars with covered wheels.

In the 1990s, Osella moved to Atella in the south of Italy where he built a new ultra-modern facility to produce some very competitive sports cars. Many of them were sold to privateers, while others were entered in several classes by the Osella works team. The works team was particularly successful in hillclimb races. In 1995 for instance works team driver Pasquale Irlando won all 9 races of the European hillclimb championship using the Osella PA20. He won the title in 1997, 1998 and 1999 consecutively. His successor Fabio Danti died in one of Osella's cars when he was competing in the 2000 Championship. Hillclimb stars like Franz Tschager and Martin Krisam continue to use Osella cars.The factory was transferred back near Turin, in Verolengo and continue activity building sport cars for hill climbing and minor sport race championship.

At the end of 2022, Osella Motorsports LTD has acquired Osella Engineering , which will see the longtime Italian prototype constructor be aligned under Enzo Osella and Giuseppe Angiulli, the heart of the company.  The company, to be known as Osella corse, will continue to produce The range currently being manufactured such, the “small” PA21 JrB from the E2B class, that can be equipped with motorcycling propellers from 1000 to 1600 cc., with a set-up both for hill climbing and track. We then arrive to the multi-titled Pa21 Evo CN2 motorised with the Honda 2 liters, a car at the Top of the class for years both in the track and hill climbing versions thanks to the continuous updates. Still among the 2 liters, but with the surprising PA 2000 (E2B) motorised with the maximum evolution of the 2000cc. 4 cylinders Honda Barchetta which has a very sophisticated aerodynamics and can count on a very reduced weight allowing it to compete with the most powerful 3000 cc.For those still not being pleased enough, are available Pa30 and FA30, respectively two-seater and single-seater of the 3000 class. According to the availability of the propeller from the client, it is possible to set it up with the V8 Zytek or in the Evo version with the V8 RPE, cars as well as pursue “new challenging projects” and international development of the brand, like the new Osella Stradale,which is currently on development.
 
“This new collaboration will breathe life into Osella and also into the spirit that has been driving us,” said Osella founder Enzo Osella.

Racing record

Complete Formula Two results
(key)

Complete Formula One results
(key) (results in bold indicate pole position)

 Not eligible for points.

Notes

References
 Official Osella site https://www.osella.it/wrp/en/# Accessed 9 April 2020 (in English)
 Osella book - Enzo Osella (Italian) Hardcover , English version 
 Osella results at Motor Sport Magazine https://database.motorsportmagazine.com/database/teams/osella Accessed 9 April 2020
 Official Formula One site: Archives 1980 – 1990 https://www.formula1.com/en/results.html/1980/races.html Accessed 9 April 2020

Formula One constructors
Formula One entrants
Formula Two constructors
Formula Two entrants
Italian auto racing teams
Italian racecar constructors
24 Hours of Le Mans teams
World Sportscar Championship teams
Sports car manufacturers
FIA Sportscar Championship entrants
Italian companies established in 1965
Vehicle manufacturing companies established in 1965
Italian brands
Car brands
Turin motor companies
Osella